Onasander or Onosander ( Onesandros or Ὀνόσανδρος Onosandros; fl. 1st century AD) was a Greek philosopher. He was the author of a commentary on the Republic of Plato, which is lost, but we still possess his Strategikos (Στρατηγικός), a short but comprehensive work on the duties of a general. It is dedicated to Quintus Veranius, consul in AD 49, and legate of Britain. It was the chief authority for the military writings of the emperors Maurice and Leo VI, and Maurice of Saxony, who consulted it in a French translation and expressed a high opinion of it.

Onasander's Strategikos is one of the most important treatises on ancient military matters and provides information not commonly available in other ancient works on Greek military tactics, especially concerning the use of the light infantry in battle.

References

Further reading
Greek Text and Translations
Aeneas Tacticus, Asclepiodotus, and Onasander. Translated by Illinois Greek Club. Loeb Classical Library, Cambridge MA, 1923 
 Kai Brodersen: Onasandros: Gute Führung / Strategikos. (Greek and German). Marix, Wiesbaden 2018 .
 Corrado Petrocelli, Onasandro, Il generale: Manuale per l’esercizio del comando (Greek and Italian). Dedalo, Bari, 2008 

Studies
 Alphonse Dain, Les manuscrits d’Onésandros (Paris 1930)
 Marco Formisano, "The Strategikós of Onasander: Taking Military Texts Seriously", Technai 2 (2011) 39–52
 Philip Rance,"The Ideal of the Roman General in Byzantium: the Reception of Onasander's Strategikos in Byzantine Military Literature", in: S. Tougher  and R. Evans (eds.), Generalship in Ancient Greece, Rome and Byzantium (Edinburgh 2022) 242-263
 Christopher J. Smith, "Onasander on How to Be a General", in: M. Austin, J.D. Harries and C.J. Smith (eds), Modus Operandi: Essays in Honour of Geoffrey Rickman (London 1998) 151–166

External links
Onasander (complete text of the English translation, from the Loeb edition)

Ancient Greek military writers
Commentators on Plato
Middle Platonists
Ancient Roman philosophers
1st-century philosophers
1st-century Greek people